Ali Ahmadi is an Afghan footballer. He has played for the Afghanistan national team.

National team statistics

External links

Living people
Afghan men's footballers
Afghanistan international footballers
Association football defenders
Year of birth missing (living people)